The 2019 Osaka gubernatorial election took place on April 7, 2019, to elect the next governor of Osaka Prefecture. Incumbent Ishin Governor Ichirō Matsui decided to not seek a third term so that he could run for mayor of Osaka city.
The election resulted in a landslide victory for Hirofumi Yoshimura, the mayor of Osaka. Yoshimura received 64% of the vote, while Tadakazu Konishi, who was supported by the  Liberal Democratic Party, Komeito and DPFP, received 35%.

Candidates 
Hirofumi Yoshimura, for Nippon Ishin no Kai.
Tadakazu Konishi, backed by the LDP, Komeito, and the DPFP.

Results

References 

2019 elections in Japan
Osaka gubernatorial elections
April 2019 events in Japan